Omar Israel Mendoza Martín (born 28 October 1988) is a Mexican professional footballer who plays as a right-back for Liga MX club Querétaro.

External links

Living people
1988 births
Mexican footballers
Association football defenders
Cruz Azul footballers
Cruz Azul Hidalgo footballers
Club Tijuana footballers
Liga MX players
Ascenso MX players
Liga Premier de México players
Footballers from Mexico City